= Durward Blackshear Collins Jr. =

American poet

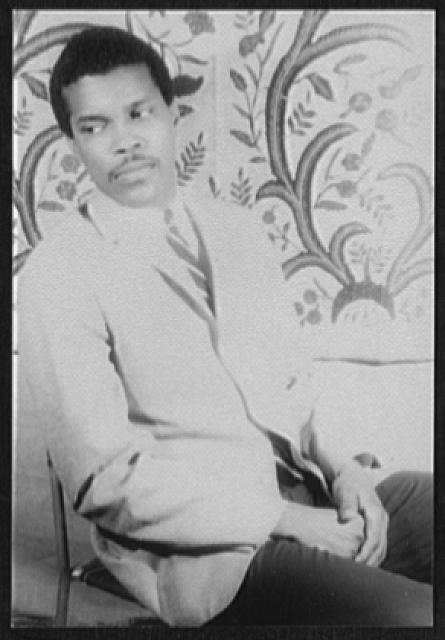
Portrait of Durward Collins, Jr. by Carl Van Vechten.

Durward Blackshear Collins Jr. (July 11, 1937 – April 12, 1987) was an American poet.

Collins was born on July 11, 1937, in Houston, Texas. He was photographed by Carl Van Vechten on September 5, 1962. Collins died in Nyack, New York on April 12, 1987, at the age of 49.

== Professional career ==
His poem "Temperate Belt: Reflections on the Mother of Emmett Till" was published in Words of protest, words of freedom: poetry of the American civil rights movement and era and In Beyond the Blues: New Poems by American Negroes.

He won the Hopwood Minor Award for Poetry from the University of Michigan in 1959.
